The 1992 Florida Citrus Bowl matched the Clemson Tigers and the California Golden Bears. It was the final game for both teams for the 1991 NCAA Division I-A football season and the 46th annual Citrus Bowl game held.

Background
The Tigers were champions of the Atlantic Coast Conference in Hatfield's 2nd year coaching the team. This was the third overall appearance in the Citrus Bowl for the Tigers, all happening in a span of four years as the team rode a six-game winning streak. The Golden Bears were 2nd in the Pacific-10 Conference to Washington after losses to Washington to Stanford, both losses knocking Cal out of the top 10 in the AP Poll. This was the Bears first consecutive bowl game appearance since the Bears' streak of three straight Rose Bowls from 1949–1951, and first Citrus Bowl.

Game summary
By the time the first quarter ended the Bears had a 17–3 lead, as Russell White ran for 103 yards on 22 rushes, Brian Treggs returned a punt return 72 yards for a touchdown, as the Cal defense made DeChane Cameron throw three interceptions and limit him to 123 yards. By halftime, it was 27-10, and the second half only had 13 points, 10 coming from California, who proved any lingering doubters that the Bears were a threat come next season.

Aftermath
Clemson would not win another ACC title until 2011. Snyder would leave for Arizona State after the bowl win, and Keith Gilbertson would follow as coach, and he continued the bowl win streak until he was fired after his 4th season. Neither team has appeared in the Citrus Bowl since this game.

Statistics

References

Florida Citrus Bowl
Citrus Bowl (game)
California Golden Bears football bowl games
Clemson Tigers football bowl games
Florida Citrus Bowl
Florida Citrus Bowl